Christopher Bryan Moneymaker (born November 21, 1975) is an American poker player who won the Main Event at the 2003 World Series of Poker (WSOP). His 2003 win is said to have revolutionized poker because he was the first person to become a world champion after qualifying at an online poker site. This has been referred to in the press as the "Moneymaker effect".

Early life
Moneymaker's ancestors made silver and gold coins and chose the name "Moneymaker" as a modification of their German last name: "Nurmacher."

Moneymaker was born in Atlanta, Georgia. He attended Farragut High School in Knoxville, Tennessee, and later earned a master's degree in accounting from the University of Tennessee. After receiving his master's degree, Moneymaker worked as a comptroller. He was also a part-time employee at a local restaurant, in Spring Hill, Tennessee.

Poker career

World Series of Poker
Moneymaker was working as an accountant when he won a seat in the Main Event of the 2003 World Series of Poker through an $86 satellite tournament at the PokerStars online poker card room. Although largely unknown prior to the tournament, on day one of the tournament his skills caught the attention of professional sports handicapper Lou Diamond, who called Moneymaker his "dark horse to win the whole tournament." Moneymaker went on to win the first prize of $2.5 million, instantly garnering poker superstar status. The 2003 WSOP Main Event was his first live poker tournament. One of Moneymaker's most memorable hands was heads-up against Sam Farha, when on the river he bluffed "all in" with King high. Farha folded a pair of nines, quickly changing the momentum of the match. After winning the Main Event, he quit his job to serve as a celebrity spokesman for Series owner Harrah's Entertainment as well as PokerStars. He also started his own company, Moneymaker Gaming, and began traveling to play in more numerous and larger buy-in tournaments.

His autobiography, Moneymaker: How an Amateur Poker Player Turned $40 into $2.5 Million at the World Series of Poker was published in March 2005. Eric Raskin, editor of All In Magazine, compiled an oral history of the 2003 WSOP Main Event, which included input from three dozen top poker personalities who were involved, also titled The "Moneymaker Effect."  As part of Moneymaker's success, it appears that Moneymaker misremembered the buy-in to the satellite that he won on PokerStars, leading to the error in the title of his autobiography, which refers to winning a $40 satellite, rather than the correct figure of $86.

Other poker tournaments
On the World Poker Tour, Moneymaker finished second at the 2004 Shooting Stars event and won $200,000.

During Event 5 of the 2008 World Championship of Online Poker, which was a $10,300 buy-in of No Limit Hold'em, Moneymaker finished in sixth place, taking home over $139,000. He also did well in Event 16, the $215 Pot Limit Omaha with Rebuys, where he finished fifth, earning over $28,000.

Moneymaker won the Deep Stack Pot Limit Omaha event of the World Poker Open tournament in July 2009 and won $15,889.

Moneymaker placed 11th in the 2011 PokerStars Caribbean Adventure Main Event, earning $130,000.

In 2011 Moneymaker placed 2nd at the National Heads Up Poker Tournament against Erik Seidel, earning $300,000.

As of 2022, his total live tournament winnings exceed $3,950,000, over $2,550,000 of which has come from the World Series of Poker.

In 2019, Moneymaker was inducted into the Poker Hall of Fame.

Personal life
Moneymaker has been married twice. He and his first wife divorced in 2004; in an interview for a 10-year retrospective on the 2003 WSOP Main Event, he said "The main reason was me wanting to be a traveling poker pro. She didn't sign up for that life. She was married to a stay-at-home accountant who was not traveling the world, gone all the time, and gambling a lot of money. And it was a choice I had to make. I tried to be good, stay at my job, and be that accountant, but in all honesty I didn't want to." With his first wife, Moneymaker has a daughter, Ashley, born three months before he won the WSOP Main Event. He married his current wife, Christina Wren, in Las Vegas in April 2005. , they live just outside of Memphis, Tennessee.

Bibliography
 Moneymaker: How an Amateur Poker Player Turned $40 into $2.5 Million at the World Series of Poker (2005) 
 Chris Moneymaker: A True Story, Graphic Novel (2015)

References

External links
 Chris Moneymaker Interview (audio + transcript)

1975 births
Living people
World Series of Poker Main Event winners
World Series of Poker bracelet winners
American gambling writers
American male non-fiction writers
American poker players
People from Atlanta
People from Nashville, Tennessee
University of Tennessee alumni
Farragut High School alumni
Poker Hall of Fame inductees